JSC Krasmash (stylized KrasMash), the Krasnoyarsk Machine-Building Plant is a company based in Krasnoyarsk, Russia and established in 1932. It is currently a Roscosmos subsidiary.

The Krasnoyarsk Machine-Building Plant was a leading producer of liquid propellant submarine-launched ballistic missiles in the USSR. It has also produced "Biryusa" refrigerators for many years and in the 1990s it converted to the production of a number of new civilian goods. The company also produced the torches for the 2014 Winter Olympics torch relay.

Products
 R-29RM Shtil
 R-29RMU Sineva
 R-29RMU2 Layner
 BZhRK Barguzin
 Blok D
 Blok DM-03
 RS-28 Sarmat

References

External links
 Official website

Manufacturing companies of Russia
Companies based in Krasnoyarsk
Roscosmos divisions and subsidiaries
Ministry of General Machine-Building (Soviet Union)
Aerospace companies of the Soviet Union